Fundación ProAves is a nonprofit environmental organization in Colombia established in 1998. Its primary aims are to protects birds of conservation concern and their habitats across Colombia.

ProAves has over 60 full-time professional staff.  Its 21 conservation programs have resulted in the creation of the largest private reserve system to protect endangered species in the country (28 strategic bird reserves protecting  and 68% of all threatened birds in Colombia).  Its achievements include significant reforestation efforts, the management of a national bird banding and monitoring program (285,000 records, 90,000 birds banded), management of three community properties that adjoin reserves through municipality agreements, the establishment of the first Colombian conservation easement, discovery of three bird species new to science, the establishment of three national, annual environmental awareness campaigns (Palm Sunday, Migratory Bird Festival and Paujil Bird Festival), and the establishment of a network of 10 local ecological groups called "Amigos de las Aves".

Principal areas Fundación ProAves is working to conserve include Serranía de las Yariguies, Serranía de los Churumbelos, Serranía de las Quinchas, the Pacific slope of Nariño, Sierra Nevada de Santa Marta, and the department of Antioquia.

Bird reserves owned, managed or supported by Fundación ProAves include:
 Reinita Cerúlea, 1300 ha
 Chincherry
 El Paujil, 1200 ha
 El Dorado, 728 ha
 Colibri del Sol, 2852 ha
 El Mirador, 2230 ha
 El Pangán, 4844 ha
 Loro Orejiamarillo, 300 ha
 Mirabilis-Swarovsky, 1900 ha

See also
 American Bird Conservancy

References

 Anonymous (2006): New Bird Discovered on Unexplored Colombian Mountain by BP Conservation Programme Project. BP Conservation Programme Newsletter 2006(27): 2–3. PDF fulltext
 Donegan, Thomas M. & Huertas, Blanca (2006): A new brush-finch in the Atlapetes latinuchus complex from the Yariguíes Mountains and adjacent Eastern Andes of Colombia. Bulletin of the British Ornithologists' Club 126(2): 94–116. PDF fulltext
 Donegan, Thomas M. & Huertas, Blanca (2005): Threatened Species of Serranía de los Yariguíes: Final Report. Published online by Fundación ProAves, Colombia. Colombian EBA Project Report Series 5. PDF fulltext
 Huertas, Blanca & Donegan, Thomas M. (2006): Proyecto YARÉ: Investigación y Evaluación de las Especies Amenazadas de la Serranía de los Yariguíes, Santander, Colombia. BP Conservation Programme. Informe Final. Published online by Fundación ProAves, Colombia. Colombian EBA Project Report Series 7. PDF fulltext
 Salaman, Paul & Donegan, Thomas M. eds. (2007): Estudios y Conservación en la Serranía de los Churumbelos. Conservacion Colombiana 3.

External links 
 
 Sistema Nacional de Anillamiento (SNA)

Nature conservation in Colombia
Animal welfare organisations based in Colombia
Bird conservation organizations
Organizations established in 1998
Environmental organisations based in Colombia